Pleuropetalum is a genus of flowering plants in the family Amaranthaceae.

Species include:
 Pleuropetalum darwinii
Pleuropetalum pleiogynum
Pleuropetalum sprucei

References

Amaranthaceae
Amaranthaceae genera
Taxonomy articles created by Polbot